Khun Yuam is a district (amphoe) of Mae Hong Son province, northern Thailand.

History
Mueang Khun Yuam was made a district (amphoe) in 1910. Khun Det Pracharak (ขุนเดชประชารักษ์) was the first head of district.

Geography
Neighboring districts are (from north clockwise): Mueang Mae Hong Son of Mae Hong Son Province, Mae Chaem of Chiang Mai province, Mae La Noi of Mae Hong Son Province, and Kayah State of Myanmar.

The Yuam River and the Mae Surin Waterfall in Namtok Mae Surin National Park are in the district.

Administration
The district is divided into six sub-districts (tambons), which are further subdivided into 45 villages (mubans). Khun Yuam is also a township (thesaban tambon) covering parts of tambon Khun Yuan. There are a further four tambon administrative organizations (TAO) and two tambon administrations (TA).

References

External links
 District website (Thai)
 Namtok Mae Surin National Park

Khun Yuam